Miljan Milivojev (born 21 November 1988) is a Serbian football striker who plays for Vittoriosa Stars F.C.

References

External links
 
 Miljan Milivojev stats at utakmica.rs

1988 births
Living people
Sportspeople from Zrenjanin
Association football forwards
Serbian footballers
FK Senta players
FK Spartak Subotica players
Serbian SuperLiga players